Clarence Hale (April 15, 1848 – April 9, 1934) was a United States district judge of the United States District Court for the District of Maine.

Education and career

Born in Turner, Maine, Hale received an Artium Baccalaureus degree from Bowdoin College in 1869, an Artium Magister degree from the same institution, then read law to enter the bar in 1871. He was in private practice in Portland, Maine from 1871 to 1902, also serving as city solicitor for Portland from 1879 to 1882, and as a member of the Maine House of Representatives from 1883 to 1886.

Federal judicial service

On May 13, 1902, Hale was nominated by President Theodore Roosevelt to a seat on the United States District Court for the District of Maine vacated by Judge Nathan Webb. Hale was confirmed by the United States Senate on May 19, 1902, and received his commission the same day. He assumed senior status on January 1, 1922, serving in that capacity until his death on April 9, 1934, in Portland.

References

Sources
 

1848 births
1934 deaths
Members of the Maine House of Representatives
Judges of the United States District Court for the District of Maine
United States district court judges appointed by Theodore Roosevelt
20th-century American judges
People from Turner, Maine
Politicians from Portland, Maine
United States federal judges admitted to the practice of law by reading law
Hale family